The Hong Kong Squash Open is an annual squash tournament held in Hong Kong in November. The tournament has both men and women's sections. The opening sections of the tournament are held at the Hong Kong Squash Centre, while the finals are contested in a glass show court outside the Hong Kong Cultural Centre.

Past Results

Men's

Women's

Statistics

List of Hong Kong Open Men's champions by number of victories

Men's champions by country

List of Hong Kong Open Women's champions by number of victories

Women's champions by country

Records

References

External links
HKSquash.org.hk - official website
Squashsite page
Squashstars page

Squash tournaments in Hong Kong
International sports competitions hosted by Hong Kong